The 2015–16 season of the Oberliga Baden-Württemberg, the highest association football league in the state of Baden-Württemberg, was the eighth season of the league at tier five (V) of the German football league system and the 38th season overall since establishment of the league in 1978.

The season began on 8 August 2015 and finished on 21 May 2016, interrupted by a winter break from 12 December to 13 February.

Standings 
The league featured five new clubs for the 2015–16 season with FSV 08 Bissingen promoted from the Verbandsliga Württemberg, SV Oberachern from the Verbandsliga Südbaden and SV Sandhausen II from the Verbandsliga Baden along with 1. CfR Pforzheim while FC Nöttingen had been relegated from the Regionalliga Südwest.

Top goalscorers
The top goal scorers for the season:

Promotion play-off
Promotion play-off will be held at the end of the season for both the Regionalliga above and the Oberliga.

To the Regionalliga
The runners-up of the Hessenliga, Oberliga Baden-Württemberg and Oberliga Rheinland-Pfalz/Saar competed for one more spot in the Regionalliga Südwest, with each team playing the other just once:

To the Oberliga
The runners-up of the Verbandsliga Baden, Verbandsliga Südbaden and Verbandsliga Württemberg play each other for one more spot in the Oberliga, whereby the Baden and Südbaden runners-up play each other first with the winner of this encounter then meets the Württemberg runners-up.
Round one

Round two

References

External links 
 Oberliga Baden-Württemberg on Fupa.net 

Baden
Oberliga Baden-Württemberg seasons